Manyo is a county in the Upper Nile State, South Sudan.

References

Upper Nile (state)
Counties of South Sudan